Aegilops bicornis (syn. Aegilops bicorne (misapplied), Triticum bicorne Forssk.) is a species in the family Poaceae native to Palestine and the Levant.

Elsewhere this plant is commonly considered a weed.

References

External links
Aegilops bicornis photo
Aegilops bicornis
GrainGenes Species Report: Aegilops bicornis 
USDA Plants Profile: Aegilops bicornis

bicornis
Flora of Palestine (region)
Flora of Western Asia